Reservoir High School is a public high school in Fulton, Maryland, United States. It was opened in 2002 and is a part of the Howard County public school system. The school is named for its proximity to the Rocky Gorge Reservoir. The school's mascot "Gators" was selected by vote in 2001, with school colors of Orange and Blue. The logo and fight song were the same as those of the University of Florida. In 2010, a cease and desist order was issued by the University, forcing the school to create a new logo.

The school is located on Maryland Route 216, just west of U.S. 29 on  shared with Fulton Elementary School, Lime Kiln Middle School, and Cedar Lane School. Reservoir follows the same general design as Long Reach High School and Marriotts Ridge High School. Neighboring Howard County schools include Atholton High School, River Hill High School, and Hammond High School.

Feeder schools for Reservoir include Hammond Middle School, Murray Hill Middle School, Patuxent Valley Middle School, and Lime Kiln Middle School. Reservoir is also well known for its work with and support for students at Cedar Lane School.

Students
Reservoir High School has an official capacity of 1,624 students.  After opening in 2002, Reservoir only enrolled 9th and 10th graders to ease the transition of redistricting amongst neighboring high schools.  The 2004-2005 school year was the first where there were students are every grade level.  The student population at Reservoir has grown moderately since opening.

The racial makeup of the student population during the 2019-2020 school year was 28.0% White, 32.6% Black or African American, 16.2% Asian/Indian, 15.5% Hispanic or Latino, and <5.0% Native American.

Principals
 Adrianne Kaufman 2002-2011
 Patrick Saunderson 2011– 2017
 Nelda Sims 2017-2020
 Karim Shortridge 2020-

Athletics
 2019- Boys’ Basketball Regional Champions, State Runner-Up
 2019- Girls’ Volleyball Regional Champions
 2015 - Boys' Football Regional Champions
 2015 - Girls' Soccer Regional Champions
 2014 - Boys' Baseball State Champions
 2012 - Boys' Soccer State Champions
 2012 - Boys' Soccer Regional Champions
 2012 - Girls' Softball Regional Champions
 2012 - Girls' Cross Country County, Regional, and State Champions
 2011 - Boys' Soccer Regional Champions
 2011 - Boys' JV Soccer County Champions
 2010 - Boys' Soccer State Champions
 2010 - Girls' Soccer State Champions
 2010 - Boys' Soccer Regional Champions
 2010 - Girls' Soccer Regional Champions
 2010 - Boys' Outdoor Track County, Regional, and State Champions
 2010 - Wrestling County Tournament, Regional Dual Meet, Regional Tournament, State Dual Meet and State Tournament Champions
 2010 - Boys' Indoor Track Regional Champions and State Runner Up
 2007 - Marching Band State Champions
 2007 - Girls' Volleyball County, Region, and State Champions
 2006 - Girls' Volleyball County and Regional Champions; State Runner Up
 2005 - Girls' Tennis County Champions
 2005 - Girls' Soccer Semifinalists 
 2005 - Girls' Indoor Track Regional Champions
 2005 - Girls' Cross Country Regional Champions

Academics
 2004-2011 - Maryland DECA State Champions (8x)
 2012* Maryland DECA State Champions (Win later vacated)* 
 2012 National Catholic Forensics League Lincoln-Douglas Debate Octofinalist
 2012-2013 Baltimore Catholic Forensics League Lincoln-Douglas Debate State Champion (2x)
 2013 Baltimore Catholic Forensics League Policy Debate State Champion
 2013 National Catholic Forensics League Lincoln-Douglas Debate Octofinalist
 2013-2015 Maryland DECA State Champions
 2014 National Catholic Forensics League Policy Debate Quarterfinalist
 2015 Baltimore Catholic Forensics League Children's Literature State Champion
 2015 Baltimore Catholic Forensics League Oral Interpretation State Champion
 2015 Baltimore Catholic Forensics League Duo Interpretation State Champion
 2016 Baltimore Catholic Forensics League Children's Literature State Champion
 2018 National Catholic Forensics League Lincoln-Douglas Debate Octofinalist
 2020 Baltimore Catholic Forensics League Speech & Debate Sweepstakes Champion
 2021 Baltimore Catholic Forensics League Duo Interpretation State Champion
 2018-2021 Baltimore Catholic Forensics League Lincoln-Douglas Debate State Champion (4x)

Notable alumni
Greg Merson - 2012 World Series of Poker bracelet winner
Cody Morris - Cleveland Guardians starting pitcher

References and notes

External links

Official website
on Google Maps

2002 establishments in Maryland
Educational institutions established in 2002
Public high schools in Maryland
Public schools in Howard County, Maryland